Judith Collins (born 1959) is a New Zealand politician that served as Leader of the Opposition.

Judith Collins may also refer to:

 Judith Collins (professor) (died 2014), an English university lecturer and researcher
 Judy Collins (born Judith Marjorie Collins, 1939), an American folk singer and songwriter